Lomasney is an Irish surname (Ó Loimeasna or Ó Lomasnaigh). Notable people with the surname include:

 Martin Lomasney (1859–1933), Massachusetts politician
 Steve Lomasney (born 1977), baseball catcher 
 William Mackey Lomasney (1841–1884), member of the Fenian Brotherhood

See also
 42 Lomasney Way, tenement in Boston

References